General Abdullahi Osman Agey is a Somali military commander. He is the Deputy Chief of the Somali National Army, having been appointed to the position on 25 June 2014 in place of General Abdirisaq Khalif Hussein. General Abdullahi Anod was concurrently named as the new Chief of Army.

References

Somalian military leaders
Living people
Somalian generals
Year of birth missing (living people)
Place of birth missing (living people)